Kalya (Kalavathi pattana)

Kalya is a historic Jain center in Karnataka, India. Kalya is in the outer area of Magadi Taluk, Ramanagara District. This place is also near to Bangalore.

Kalavathi pattana was the historic name of Kalya. This was the place for seventy-five Jain temple and one of them was a wooden Jain temple. The whole place was set to fire and destroyed.

The place has a historic connection to nearby place Sankighatta another historic Jain center which was under the control of Settru's of Sankighatta where you can still find Jain temples and Jain families.

Even now we can find that the destroyed structures of Jain temple and Kannada stone inscription in Kalya.

Hoysala Empire
Jain temples in Karnataka
History of Karnataka